Henry Bertrand Price (June 29, 1869 – September 23, 1941) was a United States Navy Captain who served as the 30th Naval Governor of Guam. As a naval officer, he served on many assignments, including with the Bureau of Ordnance. Becoming governor in 1923, Price focused on agricultural development, particularly in the region of Mangilao, Guam. He also ordered increased road building and the establishment of the Guam Department of Agriculture.

Career

Navy 
Upon graduating from the United States Naval Academy in 1895, Price became an assistant engineer and an ensign. He became a lieutenant in 1901. In 1907, he served in the Bureau of Ordnance. In 1913, he became executive officer aboard the battleship . He was promoted to the rank of Captain in 1917.

Governorship 
Price served as Governor of Guam from August 4, 1923 to August 26, 1924. During his term, he encouraged an increase in self-sufficient farming. He also developed the area of Mangilao, Guam by building a road to the village and ordering the establishment of the Guam Department of Agriculture and a dairy factory there.

Awards 
 Navy Cross for actions aboard the USS Dixie off the coast of Ireland during World War 1.

Personal life 
In December 1897, Price married Katherine French Banks at St. Andrews Cathedral in Honolulu, Hawaii.

Legacy 
The Captain Henry B. Price Elementary School is named in his honor. The school was opened in 1958 and serves grades kindergarten through five; it was named because of Price's push for agricultural development in the area in the 1920s.

References

External links 
 Henry Bertram Price at ourcampaigns.com

Governors of Guam
United States Naval Academy alumni
United States Navy personnel of World War I
1869 births
1941 deaths